Metallak (born c. 1727–1847) was a member of the band of Native Americans known as the Androscoggin, Cowasuck or, more properly, the Arosaguntacook. The band, part of the Abenaki nation, inhabited the upper Androscoggin and Magalloway rivers along the northern border of New Hampshire and Maine. They also lived in the village of St. Francis in the Canadian province of Quebec.  Metallak was, by at least one account, the youngest son of Piel, chief of the tribe.

Metallak was well known by early European settlers in the area and was on friendly terms with most of them.  Blinded by accidents in his later years, Metallak died a pauper in February 1847 at the reputed age of 120. His name survives in place names such as Metallak Island in Umbagog Lake and Richardson Lake, Metallak Pond, Metallak Brook, and also two different Metallak Mountains, one in Maine and one in New Hampshire. A locomotive at the Mount Washington Cog Railway is also named after him. He was a friend of Governor Enoch Lincoln.

Metallak is buried in Stewartstown, New Hampshire. On the gravestone is written "last of the Coashaukes". Along Route 145, a New Hampshire historical marker (number 47) notes his nearby gravesite. It reads:
"Hunter, trapper, fisherman and guide, well and favorably known by the region's early settlers. 'The Lone Indian of the Magalloway' was the last survivor of a band of Abnaki inhabiting the Upper Androscoggin. Blinded by accidents, Metallak died a town charge in 1847 at the reputed age of 120. He is buried in the North Hill Cemetery on road to the east."

Various spellings of his name include Metalluc, Matalak, Metalak, Mettalak, Metalluk, and Netalluc.

References

Further reading

External links

Year of birth unknown
1847 deaths
Native American leaders
Native American history of Maine
Native American history of New Hampshire
People from Coös County, New Hampshire
Abenaki people